The men's 5000 metres was an event at the 1956 Summer Olympics in Melbourne, Australia. The final was held on Wednesday November 28, 1956. There were a total number of 23 participants from 13 nations. Christopher Chataway, a world leading 5000 m runner in 1954, suffered from stomach cramps in the final, and finished 11th. The favorite, Vladimir Kuts, led the race from the start. By 4000 m he separated from others and continued pulling away until the finish line.

Final classification

References

External links
 Official Report
 Results

M
5000 metres at the Olympics
Men's events at the 1956 Summer Olympics